Román Ramos Álvaro (born 6 January 1991) is a Spanish motorcycle racer. During 2018 he rode for Team Go Eleven on a Kawasaki, until losing the ride to Eugene Laverty. He has also competed in the Moto2 World Championship, the CEV Supersport Championship, the Spanish Kawasaki Ninja Cup (which he won in 2007) and the CEV Moto2 Championship, which he won in 2013; in the same year he also won the European Supersport title.

Career statistics

Grand Prix motorcycle racing

By season

Races by year
(key) (Races in bold indicate pole position, races in italics indicate fastest lap)

Superbike World Championship

Races by year
(key) (Races in bold indicate pole position, races in italics indicate fastest lap)

References

External links
 

1991 births
Living people
Spanish motorcycle racers
Sportspeople from Cantabria
Moto2 World Championship riders
Superbike World Championship riders